Mandopop or Mandapop refers to Mandarin popular music. The genre has its origin in the jazz-influenced popular music of 1930s Shanghai known as Shidaiqu; with later influences coming from Japanese enka, Hong Kong's Cantopop, Taiwan's Hokkien pop, and in particular the Campus Song folk movement of the 1970s. 'Mandopop' may be used as a general term to describe popular songs performed in Mandarin. Though Mandopop predates Cantopop, the English term was coined around 1980 after "Cantopop" became a popular term for describing popular songs in Cantonese. "Mandopop" was used to describe Mandarin-language popular songs of that time, some of which were versions of Cantopop songs sung by the same singers with different lyrics to suit the different rhyme and tonal patterns of Mandarin.

Mandopop is categorized as a subgenre of commercial Chinese-language music within C-pop. Popular music sung in Mandarin was the first variety of popular music in Chinese to establish itself as a viable industry. It originated in Shanghai, and later Hong Kong, Taipei and Beijing also emerged as important centers of the Mandopop music industry. Among the regions and countries where Mandopop is most popular are mainland China, Hong Kong, Macau, Taiwan, South Korea, Japan, Malaysia, Singapore and Vietnam.

History

Beginning of recording industry in China
The Chinese-language music industry began with the arrival of gramophone, and the earliest gramophone recording in China was made in Shanghai in March 1903 by Fred Gaisberg who was sent by the Victor Talking Machine Company (VTMC) in the U.S. to record local music in Asia. The recordings were then manufactured outside China and re-imported by the Gramophone Company's sales agent in China, the Moutrie (Moudeli) Foreign Firm. The Moudeli Company dominated the market before the 1910s until the Pathé Records took over the leading role. Pathé was founded in 1908 by a Frenchman named Labansat who had previously started a novelty entertainment business using phonograph in Shanghai around the beginning of the 20th century. The company established a recording studio, and the first record-pressing plant in the Shanghai French Concession in 1914, and became the principal record company to serve as the backbone for the young industry in China. It originally recorded mainly Peking opera, but later expanded to Mandarin popular music. Later other foreign as well as Chinese-own recording companies were also established in China.

Early in the 20th century, people in China generally spoke in their own regional dialect.  Although most people in Shanghai then spoke Shanghainese, the recordings of the pop music from Shanghai from the 1920s onwards were done in Standard Mandarin, which is based on the Beijing dialect.  Mandarin was then considered as the language of the modern, educated class in China, and there was a movement to popularize the use of Mandarin as a national language in the pursuit of national unity.  Those involved in this movement included songwriters such as Li Jinhui working in Shanghai. The drive to impose linguistic uniformity in China started in the early 20th century when the Qing Ministry of Education proclaimed Mandarin as the official speech to be taught in modern schools, a policy the new leaders of the Chinese Republic formed in 1912 were also committed to. Sound films in Shanghai which started in the early 1930s were made in Mandarin because of a ban on the use of dialects in films by the then Nanjing government, consequently popular songs from films were also performed in Mandarin.

1920s: Birth of Shidaiqu in Shanghai
Mandarin popular songs that started in the 1920s were called shidaiqu (時代曲 – meaning music of the time, thus popular music), and Shanghai was the center of its production.  The Mandarin popular songs of the Shanghai era are considered by scholars to be the first kind of modern popular music developed in China, and the prototype of later Chinese pop song. Li Jinhui is generally regarded as the "Father of Chinese Popular Music" who established the genre in the 1920s. Buck Clayton, the American jazz musician, also worked alongside Li.  Li established the Bright Moon Song and Dance Troupe, and amongst their singing stars were Wang Renmei and Li Lili.  There was a close relationship between music and film industries and many of its singers also became actresses.

Around 1927, Li composed the hit song "The Drizzle" ("毛毛雨") recorded by his daughter Li Minghui (黎明暉), and this song is often regarded as the first Chinese pop song. The song, with its fusion of jazz and Chinese folk music, exemplifies the early shidaiqu – the tune is in the style of a traditional pentatonic folk melody, but the instrumentation is similar to that of an American jazz orchestra. The song however was sung in a high-pitched childlike style, a style described uncharitably as sounding like "strangling cat" by the writer Lu Xun. This early style would soon be replaced by more sophisticated performances from better-trained singers.  In the following decades, various popular Western music genres such as Latin dance music also become incorporated into Chinese popular music, producing a type of music containing both Chinese and Western elements that characterized shidaiqu.  Popular songs of the time may range from those that were composed in the traditional Chinese idiom but followed a Western principle of composition to those that were done largely in a Western style, and they may be accompanied by traditional Chinese or Western instrumentation. An example is "The Evening Primrose" by Li Xianglan, a Chinese composition set to a Latin dance beat.

1930s–1940s: The Seven Great Singing Stars era
In 1931, the first sound film was made in China in a cooperation between the Mingxing Film Company and Pathé. The film industry took advantage of the sound era and engaged singers for acting and soundtrack roles, and Li Jinhui's Bright Moonlight Song and Dance Troup became the first modern musical division to be integrated into the Chinese film industry when it joined Lianhua Film Company in 1931.  Amongst the best-known of the singer-actress to emerge in the 1930s were Zhou Xuan, Gong Qiuxia, and Bai Hong.  Although later singing stars need not also have an acting career, the close relationship between the recording and film industries continued for many decades. Later Yao Lee, Bai Guang, Li Xianglan, Wu Yingyin also became popular, and collectively these seven stars became known as the "Seven Great Singing Stars" of the period.  Other notable singers of this period include Li Lihua and Chang Loo (張露).  In 1940 Yao Lee recorded "Rose, Rose, I Love You" which later became the first Chinese pop song to be covered by Western singers that was a hit.

The "Seven Great Singing Stars" in the Republic of China period secured the place of the shidaiqu genre in East Asian society. Zhou Xuan is generally considered the most notable Chinese pop star of the era for her highly successful singing and film career. This generation saw the rise in popularity of female singers from mere "song girls" to "stars", and for the next few decades, female singers would dominate the Mandarin popular music industry.

In this period, Pathé Records dominated the recording industry. In the late 1930s to early 1940s, it held about 90% market share of the Mandarin pop songs.

The era was a tumultuous period, with the occupation of Shanghai by the Japanese armies during the Second Sino-Japanese War from 1937 and to 1945, followed by continuation of the civil war between the Nationalists and Communists. In response to the turmoil, productions began to shift to Hong Kong, and after the Communist takeover in 1949, many stars moved to Hong Kong which then replaced Shanghai as the center of the entertainment industry in the 1950s.

1950s–1960s: The Hong Kong era
In 1949, the People's Republic of China was established by the Communist party, and in 1952 popular music was denounced by the PRC government as Yellow Music, a form of pornography. In the mainland, the communist regime began to suppress popular music and promote revolutionary marches. China Record Corporation became the only music recording industry body in China, and for many years Minyue (National Music) and revolutionary music were about the only kinds of music to be recorded there.

In 1952, Pathé Records moved its operation from Shanghai to Hong Kong. Stars from Shanghai continued to record songs in Hong Kong, and Shanghai-style music remained popular in Hong Kong until the mid-1960s. Although the music is a continuation of the shidaiqu style of Shanghai, many of its songwriters did not move to Hong Kong, and many of the musicians employed in the Hong Kong music industry were Filipinos, Mandarin pop music in Hong Kong began to move away from its Shanghai roots. Also partly as a consequence of having fewer good songwriters, some songs of this period were adaptation of English-language songs, as well as songs from other regions such as the Indonesian song "Bengawan Solo" (as "梭羅河之戀") and the Latin-American song "Historia de un Amor" (as "He is not in my heart", "我的心裡沒有他"). As the style evolved, the sound of popular songs from the Hong Kong era therefore became distinct from Shanghai's. Among the recording artists of note to emerge in this period were Tsui Ping, Tsin Ting, Grace Chang (葛蘭), Fong Tsin Ying (方靜音) and Liu Yun (劉韻), some of whom were also actresses. While some actresses continued to sing in their films, some of the best known songs were dubbed by other singers, for example "Unforgettable Love" ("不了情") in the film of the same name starring Lin Dai was sung by Koo Mei (顧媚). The song was also recorded with piano and strings orchestration popular at that time.

Shanghai-style Mandarin pop songs however began to decline in popularity around the mid-1960s as Western pop music became popular among the young, and many Hong Kong performers copied Western songs and sang Hong Kong English pop songs. This in turn gave way to pop songs recorded in Cantonese as Cantopop became the dominant genre of music from Hong Kong in the 1970s.

After the Communist victory in China, the Kuomintang retreated to Taiwan. There were local stars in Taiwan and Pathé Records did business there as well, but the island's recording industry was not initially strong. Taiwanese youth were drawn to popular styles from abroad; as Taiwan was ruled by Japan from 1895 to 1945, Taiwanese pop songs in the Hokkien dialect, the actual mother tongue of most of the island's residents, were particularly strongly influenced by the Japanese Enka music. Popular Mandarin songs from Taiwan were similarly influenced, and many popular Mandarin songs of the 1960s were adaptations of Japanese songs, for example "Hard to Forget the Thought" ("意難忘", originally ) and "Hate you to the Bone" ("恨你入骨", from ). Popular songs were necessarily sung in Mandarin as Taiwan's new rulers, which imposed martial law in Taiwan in 1949, mandated its use as well as restricting the use of Taiwanese Hokkien and forbidding the use of Japanese. The Mandarin pop music developed in Taiwan that would become modern Mandopop is a blend of traditional Chinese, Japanese, Taiwanese, as well as Western musical styles. Zi Wei (紫薇) was the earliest of the Taiwan-based stars who achieved success outside of Taiwan in the late 1950s with the song "Green Island Serenade", followed by other singers such as Mei Dai (美黛) and Yao Surong (姚蘇蓉) in the 1960s. The 1960s however was a highly politically tense era, many songs such as "Not Going Home Today" ("今天不回家") by Yao Surong were banned in Taiwan.

In the 1960s, regional centres of Chinese pop music also started to emerge in overseas Chinese communities in Malaysia and Singapore, and singers from the region such as Poon Sow Keng (潘秀瓊) also achieved wider success.

1970s–1980s: Rise of Taiwanese Mandopop
In the 1970s, Taipei began to take center stage as Cantopop took hold in Hong Kong. In 1966, the Taiwan music industry was generating US$4.7 million annually, and this had grown exponentially through the 1970s and 1980s, and by 1996, it peaked at just under US$500 million before declining. The success of the Taiwanese film industry also helped with the popularity of its singers.  Taiwanese stars such as Tsai Chin, Fei Yu-ching, and Fong Fei Fei became increasingly popular, with Teresa Teng the best known.  However, the importance of Hong Kong as a center meant that some of these Taiwanese stars such as Teresa Teng were still Hong Kong-based.

Teresa Teng made Mandopop a true mainstay by crossing over to mainland China after Deng Xiaoping came to power and instituted the open door policy in 1978 that allowed cultural products from Hong Kong and Taiwan to enter China.  Teng's song became popular there despite an early ban on her songs by the PRC government for being "Bourgeois Music". Her "soft, sweet, often whispery and restrained" singing style in romantic songs such as "The Moon Represents My Heart" (月亮代表我的心) made a strong impact in mainland China where revolutionary songs were previously prevalent. A common expression then was "By day, Deng Xiaoping rules China. But by night, Deng Lijun (Teresa Teng) rules". The ban on Teng was lifted in 1986 and songs from Hong Kong and Taiwan, called gangtai music, became more popular within mainland China.

During the 1970s and early 1980s, a different generation of Taiwanese singers and/or songwriters such as Chyi Yu, Hou Dejian, and Lo Ta-yu emerged, some of whom were influenced by folk rock and whose music may be termed "campus folk music". One of the most successful songs of the era was Lo Ta-yu's 1985 song "Tomorrow Will Be Better", which was inspired by the American song "We Are the World" and originally performed by 60 singers. It quickly became a hit throughout Asia and established itself as a standard. Another song soon followed in 1986 in mainland China called "Let the World be filled with Love" (讓世界充滿愛). Hou Dejian's song "Descendants of the Dragon" (龍的傳人) also became an anthem for the period.  Unlike previous eras dominated by female singers, male singers are now popular, and other popular male singers included Liu Wen-cheng and Dave Wong. Wong released his Chinese debut album A Game A Dream (一場遊戲一場夢), which sold over 500,000-copies in December 1987. By around 1980, the term Mandopop began to be used for the Chinese popular music that had emerged in this period. Many Cantopop songs of the period were also sung in Mandarin by the same singers.

In South East Asia, popular local stars from the late 60s to the 80s included Sakura Teng (樱花), Zhang Xiaoying (張小英) and Lena Lim (林竹君) from Singapore, and Wong Shiau Chuen (黃曉君) and Lee Yee (李逸) from Malaysia. Some such as Lena Lim achieved some success outside the region, and the local labels also signed singers from outside the region such as Long Piao-Piao (龍飄飄) from Taiwan. The recording industry in Singapore in particular thrived. In 1979, Singapore launched the Speak Mandarin Campaign to promote the use of Mandarin over the range of Chinese dialects spoken by various segments of the ethnic-Chinese population. Mandarin songs, already a strong presence on radio stations and on television, further eroded the popularity of Hokkien and Cantonese songs in the media. In the 1980s, a genre of Mandarin ballads called xinyao developed in Singapore by singers/songwriters such as Liang Wern Fook.

In mainland China, the music industry was freed from state restriction in 1978, and regional recording companies were established in Guangzhou, Shanghai and Beijing in the 1980s with local singers. Pop music in China in this period was dominated by Mandopop songs from Taiwan and Cantopop from Hong Kong, however the 1980s saw the beginning of rock music in China, with the emergence of singer-songwriters such as Cui Jian, followed by others such as He Yong and bands such as Tang Dynasty which became popular in the 1990s.

1990s
A number of singers originally from mainland China such as Faye Wong and Na Ying began to record in Hong Kong and Taiwan.  Faye Wong, referred to in the media as the Diva, first recorded in Cantonese in Hong Kong, later recorded in Mandarin.  She became the first Chinese singer to perform in Budokan, Japan.

During this period, many Cantopop singers from Hong Kong such as the "Four Heavenly Kings" - Aaron Kwok, Leon Lai, Andy Lau and Jacky Cheung - also began to dominate Mandopop. One of the best-selling Mandarin albums was the 1993 album The Goodbye Kiss by Jacky Cheung which sold over 1 million in Taiwan and 4 million in total Asia-wide. Nonetheless, Taiwan has their own popular singers such as Stella Chang, Sky Wu, Wakin Chau (formerly Emil Chau) and Jeff Chang. Independent labels such as Rock Records began to establish themselves in this period as some of the most influential labels.  Towards the end of the 90s, other singers such as Leehom Wang and David Tao became popular, and some also began to perform in the R&B and/or hip-hop genres.

In the period from the mid-1990s to early 2000s, Shanghai and Beijing became centers of the music industry in mainland China, with Shanghai focusing on music record publishing and distribution, while Beijing focused on music recording.

2000s-2010s: Growth in Mainland China

In Hong Kong, the Four Heavenly Kings faded in the 2000s, but many other new artists such as Nicholas Tse and Eason Chan came to the fore.
The 2000s also began with an explosion of pop idols, many of whom are from Taiwan. Mainland China also saw a rapid increase in the number of Mandopop singers, bands, and idol groups as pop music becomes increasingly mainstream by mid-2000s. The growing Mainland film industry and Chinese television drama also increased demand for Mandopop. Since the 2000s, the emergence of indie rock in mainland China and Taiwan had exploded into a flourishing indie music scene in mainland China and Taiwan, adding various new diversities into Mandopop. Entry of popular Taiwan-based bands such as Mayday and Sodagreen while in mainland Chinese-based bands such as SuperVC and Milk Coffee had brought a new phase of rock fusion into Mandopop.

The music industry in Taiwan, however, began to suffer from music piracy in the digital age, and its revenue plummeted to $US95 million in 2005.  The primary revenue sources in Taiwan music industry shifted to advertising, concerts, KTV (karaoke) and movie. The dramatic decline of CD sales shifted the market in favour of mainland China. While piracy was also severe in mainland China, the percentage of its digital sales is higher compared to most countries. 2005 was known as 'The First Year of Digital Music' in China as its digital music sales of $US57 million overtook CDs in 2005, and it also overtook Taiwan in term of the retail value of its music sales.

However, while mainland China became increasingly important in generating revenue, the pop music industry itself in mainland China was still relatively small in the decade of 2000s compared to Taiwan and Hong Kong as popstars from Taiwan and other overseas Chinese communities were still popular in mainland China. Mandopop singers such as Jay Chou were popular performing in the rhythm and blues and rap music genre, popularising a new fusion style of music known as zhongguofeng. Other successful singers include Stefanie Sun and Jolin Tsai.  Many Cantopop singers also turned towards the Mandopop industry due to disputes among entertainment and record companies in Hong Kong and to increase their fan base.

In recent years, the burgeoning number of contests have brought an idol concept (偶像, ǒuxiàng) to the Mandopop industry. Nationwide singing competitions in mainland China, such as the Super Girl, Super Boy, The Voice of China, Chinese Idol, and The X Factor: Zhongguo Zui Qiang Yin, have greatly boosted Mandopop's influence many contestants emerge as successful singers such as Joker Xue, Jane Zhang, Bella Yao, Chris Lee (Li Yuchun), Jason Zhang, Chen Chusheng, Momo Wu Mochou, Laure Shang Wenjie, etc. The same phenomenon also occurred in Taiwan, from the show One Million Star and Super Idol, new talented singers have entered the Mandopop market, including Aska Yang, Yoga Lin, Lala Hsu and so on. In Taiwan, the term "quality idol" (優質偶像, yōuzhì ǒuxiàng) has entered the popular lexicon, referring to Mandopop singers who are good-looking, talented and highly educated, among them Wang Leehom and William Wei.

Recent years also saw the rise in crossover appeal of Taiwanese bubblegum pop boybands and girl bands to the mainland Chinese scene, such as the very commercially successful acts like S.H.E and Fahrenheit. Several new boybands and girl bands also have emerged in mainland China such as Top Combine, TFBOYS and Idol Producer and Produce Camp boy groups including Nine Percent, NEX7, UNINE, R1SE, INTO1, THE9, Rocket Girls and Oner.

Characteristics

Instruments and setups
Shidaiqu originated as a fusion of Chinese traditional music and European popular music, and therefore instruments from both genres were used from the very beginning of Mandopop.  Songs performed in the traditional style employed traditional Chinese instruments like the erhu, pipa, and sanxian, such as in the recording of "The Wandering Songstress" (天涯歌女) by Zhou Xuan, whereas more Western orchestral instruments such as trumpets, violins, and piano were used in songs like "Shanghai Nights" (夜上海), also by Zhou Xuan.  Big band and jazz instruments and orchestrations from the swing era were common in the early years.  Chinese and Western instruments were also combined in some recordings.

In the 1960s, the electric guitar began to be used. Starting around the 1970s, electronic organs/synthesizers began to be heavily featured, which characterized the Mandopop music of the era.  Today's Mandopop arrangements are generally westernized, covering many musical styles, including R&B, hip hop, ballads, and Pop. Mandopop switched from simple imitation to adjusting the melodies and lyrics creatively in short time. Some pop stars became famous because they were presented to meet the Chinese aesthetics standard and culture features. A few Chinese pop musicians—most notably Jay Chou, Lin Jun Jie, David Tao, Leehom Wang —have experimented with fusing traditional Chinese instruments with Western styles (such as hip hop beats and progressive rock) all over again in a new style known as China Wind music (zhongguofeng), influencing many Chinese singers worldwide.

Industry

Labels
Popular music record labels includes independent labels such as JVR Music, Linfair Records, B'In Music and subsidiaries of major labels such as Sony Music Taiwan, Universal Music Taiwan, Warner Music Taiwan. In the past few years, mainland labels such as EE-Media, Huayi Brothers, Taihe Rye Music, Show City Times, Idol Entertainment, and Tian Hao Entertainment have also emerged.
Historical
 Shanghai: Pathé Records, Great Wall, New Moon, Greater China
 Hong Kong: Pathé Records/EMI, Phillips, Diamond Records
Modern
 Mainland China: EE-Media, Huayi Brothers, Taihe Rye Music, Show City Times, Idol Entertainment, TH Entertainment, Yuehua Entertainment, Wajijiwa Entertainment
 Taiwan: Rock Records, HIM International Music, Linfair Records, Avex Taiwan, B'in Music
 Hong Kong: Gold Typhoon, Emperor Group
 Singapore: Ocean Butterflies International, Hype Records

Music distribution outside Asia
Mandopop titles are also available outside of Asia. Chinese communities established in North America have made Mandopop music accessible through local businesses. In the United States, Canada and Australia they are easily found in many major urban areas, such as San Francisco Bay Area, Los Angeles, San Diego, New York City, Vancouver, Toronto, Sydney, and Melbourne .

Charts
The Global Chinese Pop Chart is a record chart organised since 2001 by 7 radio stations from Beijing, Shanghai, Guangdong, Hong Kong, Singapore, Taipei and Kuala Lumpur.

In Taiwan, G-Music Chart (Chinese: 風雲榜 fēngyúnbǎng) is the most popular music ranking. It was first officially published on 7 July 2005, and compiled the top physically sold CD releases in Taiwan (including both albums and physically released singles). Only the top 20 positions are published, and instead of sales, a percentage ranking is listed next to each release.

Awards

 Beijing Popular Music Awards (Mainland China)
 CCTV-MTV Music Awards (Mainland China)
 Chinese Music Awards (Mainland China)
 Four Stations Joint Music Awards (Hong Kong)
 Golden Melody Awards (Taiwan)
 HITO Radio Music Awards (Taiwan)
 Jade Solid Gold Best Ten Music Awards (Hong Kong)
 M Music Awards (Mainland China)
 Metro Radio Mandarin Music Awards (Hong Kong)
 RTHK Top 10 Gold Songs Awards (Hong Kong)
 Singapore Hit Awards (Singapore)
 Freshmusic Awards (Singapore)
 Top Chinese Music Awards (Mainland China)
 Ultimate Song Chart Awards (Hong Kong)
 V Chart Awards (Mainland China)

Mandopop radio stations

See also

 Music of China
 Music of Taiwan
 Taiwanese Wave
 C-pop
 Chinese R&B
 French Mandopop
 J-pop
 K-pop
 Pinoy pop
 Taiwanese pop
 V-pop
 List of best-selling albums in Taiwan
 Chinese television drama
 Taiwanese drama

References

External links
 Videos about Taiwan's Mandopop Music Empire
 Introduction to Mandopop (Cpop) (Tumblr Blog)
 Official Pandeh Music (Cpop Music Channel)

 
C-pop
Pop music genres
Fusion music genres
Taiwanese pop
Taiwanese music
Chinese music